The 1977–78 Algerian Championnat National was the 16th season of the Algerian Championnat National after its establishment in 1962. A total of 14 teams contested the league, with JS Kawkabi as the defending champions. The Championnat started on September 30, 1977, and ended on May 5, 1978.

Team summaries

Promotion and relegation 
Teams promoted from Algerian Division 2 1977–1978 
 No promoted

Teams relegated to Algerian Division 2 1978–1979
 No relegated

League table

References

External links
1977–78 Algerian Championnat National

Algerian Ligue Professionnelle 1 seasons
1977–78 in Algerian football
Algeria